is a train station in Nishi-ku, Niigata, Niigata Prefecture, Japan, operated by East Japan Railway Company (JR East).

Lines

Station layout
The station consists of one ground-level side platform serving a single bi-directional track. The station is staffed.

Suica farecard can be used at this station.

History 
The station opened on 13 March 1988.

Passenger statistics
In fiscal 2017, the station was used by an average of 1051 passengers daily (boarding passengers only).

Surrounding area
 BRT "Bandai-bashi Line" bus stop 'Aoyama' (Stop No.16) is located on the southeast side of AEON Niigata Aoyama Shopping Center, about 10 minutes' walk away from the station

References

External links
 JR East station information 

Railway stations in Niigata (city)
Railway stations in Japan opened in 1988
Stations of East Japan Railway Company
Echigo Line